There have been several ships in the Royal Norwegian Navy named after the Norwegian explorer and Nobel peace prize winner Fridtjof Nansen.

  – patrol vessel from 1931.
  – a new class of Aegis frigates from 2005.
  lead ship of the class.

See also
 , a cruise ship

Royal Norwegian Navy ship names
Fridtjof Nansen